Murray Town is a suburb in Sierra Leone's capital of Freetown. The Amputees and War Wounded Association is based here arising from the local camp for such people. The  Sierra Leone Grammar School is also located here. Murray Town contains many colonial style board houses dating back to the turn of the 20th century.

History
Murray Town was founded in April 1829 to provide accommodation for liberated enslaved Africans, who had been brought to Freetown by the British Royal Navy West Africa Squadron. It originally housed three hundred and twenty six liberated Africans, under the management of a former African soldier of the Royal African Corps. It was constructed as four wide streets.

Famous people
Thomas Leighton Decker, linguist, poet and Krio language revisionist.

References

Murray Town
Sierra Leone Liberated African villages
Populated places established by Sierra Leone Creoles